Events from the year 1647 in France.

Incumbents 
Monarch: Louis XIV
Regent: Anne of Austria

Events
 14 March – Thirty Years' War: France, Bavaria, Cologne, and Sweden sign the Truce of Ulm.

Births
 18 February – Denis-Nicolas Le Nourry, Benedictine scholar (d. 1724)
 12 March – Victor-Maurice, comte de Broglie, general (d. 1727)
 22 August – Denis Papin, inventor (d. 1713 in Great Britain)
 18 November – Pierre Bayle, philosopher (d. 1706)
 30 December – Jean Martianay, Benedictine scholar (d. 1717)

Deaths
 14 January – François L’Anglois, painter, engraver, printer, bookseller, publisher, and art dealer (b. 1589)
 1 December – Joseph Gaultier de la Vallette, astronomer (b. 1564)

See also

References

1640s in France